The World Mixed Pairs Championship is a bridge championship for mixed-gender pairs held every four years as part of the World Bridge Championships.

Results

World meets commonly run for 15 days on a schedule whose details vary.

In 2006 the Mixed Pairs played Saturday to Monday, the first three days of the meet, with no other events underway. There were three qualifier and three final sessions with a consolation event ("Plate") during the last two sessions. Contemporary coverage lists 481 pairs in the qualifying stage; 182 in the final stage; 238 and 232 pairs in the two-session Plate on the third day, or almost 80% of the non-qualifiers.

The 2010 champions Donna Compton and Fulvio Fantoni, from the U.S. and Italy, were the first transnational winners, but they were succeeded by 2014 champions Kerri Sanborn and Jack Zhao from the U.S. and China. United States pairs had won seven of the preceding 11 tournaments. Sanborn also won the gold medal as Kerri Shuman in 1978, playing with Barry Crane, and she is the only double winner. Sanborn/Shuman and Sabine Auken/Zenkel of Germany have won three medals.

Five champions have also won the Open or Women Pairs: Mary Jane Farell, Kerri Sanborn, Karen McCallum, Jeff Meckstroth, and Fulvio Fantoni. At one meet the best performances are Joan Durran winning gold and silver in 1966, Marcin Leśniewski gold and bronze in 1994.

See also
World Open Pairs Championship
World Women Pairs Championship

Notes

References

External links
 World Mixed Pairs Championships 1966–present (table) at the World Bridge Federation

Mixed Pairs
Contract bridge mixed pairs